Max Ferguson, OC (February 10, 1924 – March 7, 2013) was a Canadian radio personality and satirist, best known for his long-running radio programs Rawhide and The Max Ferguson Show on the Canadian Broadcasting Corporation (CBC).

Biography

Early life 
Max Ferguson was born on 10 February 1924, in Crook, Durham, England, the second son of William George (George) Ferguson and Isabella Frances (Isabel) née Finnegan.

In 1926, with Max barely past his second birthday, the Ferguson family emigrated to Canada, departing from Cobh, Ireland on 22 May aboard the Minnedosa, and arriving in Montreal, Quebec on the 29th. They eventually settled in Ontario.

Other than an occasional trip to Ireland, visiting relatives in his mother's birthplace in County Laois (aka County Leix and Queen's County), Ferguson was raised in London, Ontario, and graduated from the University of Western Ontario with a BA in English and French.

Career 

In the summer of 1946 he was hired as an announcer at radio station CFPL in London, but later that year relocated to Halifax, Nova Scotia, for the opportunity to join the CBC as a staff announcer with the local station in the CBC Halifax Radio Building. According to his autobiography, And Now...Here's Max (1967), he was appalled to find among his assignments the task of hosting a cowboy music show called After Breakfast Breakdown. To protect his anonymity, and in hopes of quick reassignment, he improvised the character of "Old Rawhide", assuming the voice of an elderly ranch hand and giving colourfully disdainful appraisals of the songs he introduced. The character was a breath of fresh air to listeners of the staid national broadcaster, and they relayed their approval with volumes of mail. Accepting his fate, Ferguson devised an entire repertory company of raucous and bizarre characters to interact with Rawhide (all voiced by Ferguson) to amuse himself and his audience, creating daily skits which parodied literary classics and satirized current events and CBC personalities.  Recurring characters (other than Rawhide) included pompous, adenoidal CBC announcer Marvin Mellobell, The Goomer Brothers, Little Harold, The Black Widow Spider, and the adventurous Granny.

In 1949, the show's popularity led the corporation to transfer Ferguson to its head office in Toronto, where he would broadcast nationally. Rawhide's first coast-to-coast broadcasts caused something of a national controversy when a Member of Parliament rose to denounce the show for its low humour and abuse of the English language. However, it remained one of the most popular programs on air, lasting some seventeen years. Along the way, the cowboy music was dropped in favour of esoteric folk music, making Ferguson a pioneer in the world music genre long before the term existed. He was also able to originate his broadcasts from his beloved Maritimes for a few years in the mid-1950s. Between 1955 and 1960, Ferguson recorded three albums on Folkways Records, each a part of the Rawhide satirical series.  From 1954 to 1961, (while continuing the Rawhide radio program) he branched out to television to host the nightly CBC Halifax program Gazette, and later the CBC Toronto production Tabloid.

Ferguson announced he was retiring Rawhide and all of the associated Rawhide characters in 1962, and kept to his word—his subsequent radio ventures did not incorporate any of these characters. Instead, he launched the 5-days-a-week Max Ferguson Show beginning in 1962, featuring ethnic music and topical skits based on the news of the day. The latter were always highlighted by Ferguson's uncanny ability to mimic prominent politicians and celebrities. Ferguson wrote his own topical sketches, based on the morning's news, and performed all the voices live-to-air.  The show was introduced in grandiloquent fashion by another CBC legend, Allan McFee, who always ended his piece with the mellifluous "And now...here's Max".

Ferguson was the subject of the 1966 National Film Board of Canada profile Max in the Morning which detailed a typical morning spent preparing and hosting his radio show.  That same year he went down in history as the first man to voice the Hulk for Marvel Comics in "The Marvel Super Heroes" show with fellow radio host Paul Soles voicing Bruce Banner.  He also narrated several films, and wrote the whimsical children's story and its subsequent film short "Has Anybody Seen My Umbrella?" (1990).

The radio show remained what Ferguson was best known for, however.  The daily Max Ferguson Show wrapped up on June 25, 1971 after a -year run; Ferguson's final sketch featured John Diefenbaker, Pierre Trudeau and Robert Stanfield (all voiced by Ferguson) expressing relief that they would no longer be on the show.

After some time off, Ferguson returned to the CBC airwaves, appearing on Saturday morning. For this iteration of The Max Ferguson Show—which would run for over 25 years—Ferguson dropped the skits and relied exclusively on his outspoken charm and facility with the language, as well as his unique selection of offbeat music and comedy tracks.

Long-time announcer McFee, whose programme The Eclectic Circus, preceded Max's show, retired from the CBC in 1989; but he continued to introduce Ferguson's show until failing health forced him to step down in early 1991.  Shelagh Rogers, who had appeared fairly regularly starting in the mid-90s as a sort of conversational companion for Ferguson, assumed the announcer's task for the show's final few months. Rogers soon became a top network host in her own right.

Max Ferguson retired from broadcasting in 1998, having spent over 50 years at the CBC. Over the years, he garnered many awards, including the 1968 Stephen Leacock Award for humour for his autobiography, And Now...Here's Max. He was appointed an Officer of The Order of Canada in 1970 and in 2001 was chosen as a recipient of the Governor General's Performing Arts Award for Lifetime Artistic Achievement. He was the recipient of the John Drainie Award and the Gordon Sinclair Award. He held honorary degrees from the University of Western Ontario, Dalhousie University, the University of Waterloo, Brock University and the University of Saskatchewan.

Marriages and Children 
Ferguson married firstly Norma Georgina "Ginger" Fraser on 9 April 1949; the couple having five children.
The marriage with Norma Fraser having ended (she died in 2008), in 1979 Ferguson married secondly former CBC producer Pauline Janitch.  The couple had one child, Anthony Ferguson (October 22, 1984).

Death 
Max Ferguson, OC, died of a heart attack on 7 March 2013, at the Northumberland Hills Hospital, Cobourg, Ontario, aged 89 years.  His wife, Pauline, and children Scott, Nancy, Anne, Nonie, Bill, and Tony, were by his side.

Published works
 And Now...Here's Max (1967; republished 2009 with new foreword by Shelagh Rogers)
 The Unmuzzled Max (1971)
 Has Anybody Seen My Umbrella?, illustrated by Jane Kurisu (1982)

References

External links

 Bio on the Canadian Communications Foundation site.
 audio clips on CBC site archives.
 Rawhide: Radio Programme at Smithsonian Folkways
 Publisher's Bio

1924 births
2013 deaths
Canadian male radio actors
Canadian male voice actors
Canadian television hosts
English emigrants to Canada
Male actors from London, Ontario
Officers of the Order of Canada
University of Western Ontario alumni
People from Durham, England
CBC Radio hosts
Stephen Leacock Award winners
Governor General's Performing Arts Award winners
Canadian impressionists (entertainers)
Canadian Screen Award winning journalists